The 2019 Drydene 400 was a Monster Energy NASCAR Cup Series race that was held on October 6, 2019 at Dover International Speedway in Dover, Delaware. Contested over 400 laps on the one-mile (1.6  km) concrete speedway, it was the 30th race of the 2019 Monster Energy NASCAR Cup Series season, the fourth race of the Playoffs, and the first race of the Round of 12.

The race was Larson's first win of the season.

Report

Background

Dover International Speedway (formerly Dover Downs International Speedway) is a race track in Dover, Delaware, United States. Since opening in 1969, it has held at least two NASCAR races. In addition to NASCAR, the track also hosted USAC and the Verizon IndyCar Series. The track features one layout, a  concrete oval, with 24° banking in the turns and 9° banking on the straights. The speedway was owned and operated by Dover Motorsports.

The track, nicknamed "The Monster Mile", was built in 1969 by Melvin Joseph of Melvin L. Joseph Construction Company, Inc., with an asphalt surface, but was replaced with concrete in 1995. Six years later in 2001, the track's capacity moved to 135,000 seats, making the track have the largest capacity of sports venue in the mid-Atlantic. In 2002, the name changed to Dover International Speedway from Dover Downs International Speedway after Dover Downs Gaming and Entertainment split, making Dover Motorsports. From 2007 to 2009, the speedway worked on an improvement project called "The Monster Makeover", which expanded facilities at the track and beautified the track. After the 2014 season, the track's capacity was reduced to 95,500 seats.

Entry list
 (i) denotes driver who are ineligible for series driver points.
 (R) denotes rookie driver.

Practice

First practice

Final practice

Qualifying

Qualifying results

Race

Stage results

Stage One
Laps: 120

Stage Two
Laps: 120

Final stage results

Stage Three
Laps: 160

Race statistics
 Lead changes: 14 among 9 different drivers
 Cautions/Laps: 3 for 17
 Red flags: 0
 Time of race: 2 hours, 56 minutes and 49 seconds
 Average speed:

Media

Television
NBC Sports covered the race on the television side. Rick Allen, 2006 race winner Jeff Burton, Steve Letarte and 2001 race winner Dale Earnhardt Jr. had the call in the booth for the race. Dave Burns, Marty Snider and Kelli Stavast reported from pit lane during the race.

Radio
MRN had the radio call for the race, which was simulcast on Sirius XM NASCAR Radio. Alex Hayden, Jeff Striegle and 3 time Dover winner Rusty Wallace had the call for MRN when the field raced down the front straightaway. Mike Bagley called the race from a platform outside turn 3 when the field raced down the back straightaway. Winston Kelley, Steve Post, and Kim Coon called the race for MRN from pit lane.

Standings after the race

Manufacturers' Championship standings

Note: Only the first 16 positions are included for the driver standings.

References

2019 in sports in Delaware
2019 Monster Energy NASCAR Cup Series
NASCAR races at Dover Motor Speedway
October 2019 sports events in the United States